Sahil is an administrative region (gobol) in northern Somaliland with the port city of Berbera as its capital. It was separated from Woqooyi Galbeed and became a province in 1991. In 1998, the Sheikh District of Togdheer was incorporated into Sahil region. The region has a long coastline facing the Gulf of Aden to the north. Sahil borders Awdal to the northwest, Maroodi Jeex to the southwest, Togdheer to the south and Sanaag to the east.

History 
Formerly known as the Berbera District, it was one of six districts that made up the British Somaliland protectorate. In 1960, the then independent State of Somaliland merged with Italian Somaliland to form the Somali Republic. By 1964, the then Berbera District merged with the Borama district (now Awdal) and the Hargeisa district (now Maroodi Jeh) to form the  Woqooyi Galbeed region (literally North West, also known as Hargeisa region).

During the period from 1968 to 1982, parts of the district were incorporated into Togdheer region. Awdal was carved out of the western parts of Woqooyi Galbeed region in June 1984. However, Sahil was the only of the six former British territories to be rebuilt during the Somali government's reign.

When the Somali Civil War broke out, the former British territory declared the revival of the pre-independent state of Somaliland. In December 1989, the Somaliland government established Sahil region. In 1998, the Sheikh District was incorporated from Togdheer. Under the Local Autonomy Act of 2002, it was positioned as one of the six regions that make up Somaliland.

The Somaliland was reorganized on March 22, 2008, and the territory of Sahil was changed. However, a new local government law came into force on January 4, 2020, and the territory was restored.

Districts 

The regional capital of the Sahil region is the port city of Berbera. The region is further divided into the following two districts:

Major towns 
Towns in Sahil include:
 Abdaal
 Bulhar
 Laas Ciidle
 Go'da Wayn
 Xagal
 Beeyo Macaan
 Karin
 Siyara
 El-Sheikh
 El-Darad

Demographics
According to the Somaliland Ministry of National Planning Sahil had a population of 49,244 in 1997.

The Sahil region is inhabited by people from the Somali ethnic group. This region is inhabited by the Habr Awal, Garhajis and Habr Je'lo clans of the broader Isaaq clan family.

Map

See also
Administrative divisions of Somaliland
Regions of Somaliland
Districts of Somaliland
Somalia–Somaliland border

References

Regions of Somaliland
Populated places in Sahil, Somaliland